Madagupatti is a village in Sivaganga district in the Indian state of Tamil Nadu. This village is part of Sivaganga taluk in the Sivaganga district.

Temples
Madagupatti is home to a famous Shiva temple and a 125-year-old Santhana Gopala Krishnan temple (renovated in 2007) both near the bus terminus and a mosque in Sivagangai.

Industries
Jeyesundaram cotton mill, rajayogan sugarcane industry.

References

Villages in Sivaganga district